Antonio Mejía Haro (born 10 June 1957) is a Mexican politician affiliated with the PRD. As of 2013 he served as Senator of the LX and LXI Legislatures of the Mexican Congress representing Zacatecas. He also served as federal deputy during the LIX Legislature as well as a local deputy in the XVI Legislature of the Congress of Zacatecas.

References

1957 births
Living people
Politicians from Zacatecas
Members of the Senate of the Republic (Mexico)
Members of the Chamber of Deputies (Mexico)
Members of the Congress of Zacatecas
Party of the Democratic Revolution politicians
20th-century Mexican politicians
21st-century Mexican politicians
Autonomous University of Zacatecas alumni
Universidad Autónoma Agraria Antonio Narro alumni
Academic staff of the Autonomous University of Zacatecas